= Hyosus =

Scientific classification
- Domain: Eukaryota
- Kingdom: Animalia
- Phylum: Chordata
- Class: Mammalia
- Order: Artiodactyla
- Family: Suidae
- Genus: †Hyosus; Pilgrim, 1926

Extinct genus of even-toed ungulates

Hyosus was an extinct genus of even-toed ungulates that existed in India.
